Highsted Grammar School is a state-funded selective secondary school (grammar school) for girls in Sittingbourne, Kent.

History
The school was established in 1904 in Brenchley House on Sittingbourne High Street as Sittingbourne High School for Girls. It moved to its current site in Highsted Road in the late 1950s, at which time it was known as Sittingbourne Girls’ Grammar School (SGGS).

In common with many secondary schools in England, Highsted has a house system. When formed in 1904 the houses were: Briton, Cymru, Scots and Spartan. The houses now are: Chanel, Eliot, Franklin, Keller, Roddick, Seacole.

The school, now known as Highsted Grammar School, converted to Academy status in 2011. It now takes both boys and girls into its Sixth Form. In September 2013, Anne Kelly took over as headteacher after the retirement of former headteacher Jennifer Payne.

Description
Virtually all maintained schools and academies follow the National Curriculum, and are inspected by Ofsted on how well they succeed in delivering a 'broad and balanced curriculum'.  Unusually, Highsted which converted to an academy in 2011 has not had a Section 5 inspection since then. On conversion, all schools have a three-year exemption window: Ofsted looked at the previous maintained school's last two inspections and has not seen the need to do an inspection.

Within  a three-year Key Stage 3, year 7, 8 and 9 pupils study the complete  range  of  National  Curriculum  subjects. The  core  programme  is  English,  Mathematics,  3 Sciences   Information  &  Communications  Technology   (ICT),  History,   Geography,  and  Modern   Languages  chosen from  French, German  and  Spanish.  Art  &  Design,  Design  &  Technology,  Drama,  Food  &  Nutrition, Music, Physical Education (PE) and Religious Education (RE)are also taught.   There  is  also  a  Personal,  Social,  Health  and  Economic  education  (PSHE)  curriculum is delivered using focus days and is included in a Highsted feature, the voluntary but heavily advised 'Super Curriculum'.
 Contrary to the Ofsted recommendation, certain pupils will commence some GCSE subjects in year 9. Students start by doing 3 lots of 30-min long homework a night.

Years 10 and 11 are the Key Stage 4 examination years,  Like all other schools, GCSE courses are currently studied, Which include the core of compulsory subjects needed to reach the Progress 8 benchmark: English (Language and Literature), Mathematics, Science (Biology, Chemistry & Physics) taken to GCSE as core and additional or three separate Science subjects, ICT (Diploma in  Digital  Applications), a  Modern  Language  (from  French,  German  or  Spanish),  and  either Geography or History.  
Further options are studied for GCSE examinations; these are typically on offer: Art & Design,  Business  Studies,  Design & Technology,  Drama, a second Modern Language, Music, a second humanities subject, PE, RE and Sociology.  Other non-exam courses are provided to meet statutory requirements:  PE, PSHE, Careers Education and RE.

In Key Stage 5 otherwise known as the Sixth Form, a traditional range of 'A level' academic courses are offered

Social
A Facebook page was set up in 2014 with the aim of creating a Highsted Old Girls Association.

References 

Sittingbourne
Grammar schools in Kent
Academies in Kent